Pakistan's Central Zone was an occasional first-class cricket team based in Bahawalpur and Sahiwal which played a total of six matches, mostly against touring teams, between 1955 and 1969.

References

Pakistani first-class cricket teams